In mathematics, a congruence is an equivalence relation on the integers.  The following sections list important or interesting prime-related congruences.

Table of congruences characterizing special primes

Other prime-related congruences

There are other prime-related congruences that provide necessary and sufficient conditions on the primality of certain subsequences of the natural numbers. 
Many of these alternate statements characterizing primality are related to Wilson's theorem, or are restatements of this classical result given in terms of other 
special variants of generalized factorial functions. For instance, new variants of Wilson's theorem stated in terms of the 
hyperfactorials, subfactorials, and superfactorials are given in.

Variants of Wilson's theorem

For integers , we have the following form of Wilson's theorem: 
 
If  is odd, we have that

Clement's theorem concerning the twin primes

Clement's congruence-based theorem characterizes the twin primes pairs of the form  through the following conditions: 
 
P. A. Clement's original 1949 paper  provides a 
proof of this interesting elementary number theoretic criteria for twin primality based on Wilson's theorem. 
Another characterization given in Lin and Zhipeng's article provides that

Characterizations of prime tuples and clusters

The prime pairs of the form  for some  include the special cases of the cousin primes (when ) and the sexy primes  (when ). We have elementary congruence-based characterizations of the primality of such pairs, proved for instance in the article. Examples of congruences characterizing these prime pairs include 
 
and the alternate characterization when  is odd such that  given by 
 
Still other congruence-based characterizations of the primality of triples, and more general prime clusters (or prime tuples) exist and are typically proved starting from Wilson's theorem (see, for example, Section 3.3 in ).

References

Congruences
Modular arithmetic